The 1940 All-Southwest Conference football team consists of American football players chosen by various organizations for All-Southwest Conference teams for the 1940 college football season.  The selectors for the 1940 season included the Associated Press (AP) and United Press (UP).

All Southwest selections

Backs
 Pete Layden, Texas (AP-1, UP-1 [hb])
 Jim Thomason, Texas A&M (AP-1, UP-1 [hb])
 Preston Johnston, SMU (AP-1, UP-1 [qb])
 John Kimbrough, Texas A&M (AP-1, UP-1 [fb])
 Robert Brumley, Rice (AP-2, UP-2 [fb])
 Marion Pugh, Texas A&M (AP-2, UP-2 [hb])
 Jack Crain, Texas (AP-2, UP-2 [hb])
 William Conatser, Texas A&M (AP-2)
 Kyle Gillespie, TCU (UP-2 [qb])

Ends
 James Sterling, Texas A&M (AP-1, UP-2)
 Jack Russell, Baylor (AP-1, UP-1)
 Phil Roach, TCU (AP-2, UP-1)
 Malcolm Kutner, Texas (AP-2)
 Red Hickey, Arkansas (UP-2)

Tackles
 Ernest Pannell, Texas A&M (AP-1, UP-1)
 Fred Hartman, Rice (AP-1, UP-1)
 Joe Pasqua, SMU (AP-2)
 Jack Anderson, Baylor (AP-2, UP-2)
 Chipp Routt, Texas A&M (UP-2)

Guards
 Marshall Robnett, Texas A&M (AP-1, UP-1)
 Bobby Sherrod, TCU (AP-1, UP-1)
 Charles Henke, Texas A&M (AP-2, UP-2)
 Chal Daniel, Texas (AP-2, UP-2)

Centers
 Ken Whitlow, Rice (AP-1, UP-1)
 Robert Nelson, Baylor (AP-2, UP-2)

Key

See also
1940 College Football All-America Team

References

All-Southwest Conference
All-Southwest Conference football teams